The electoral district of Anglesey was an electoral district of the Legislative Assembly in the Australian state of Victoria.

The district of Anglesey was one of the initial districts of the first Victorian Legislative Assembly, 1856. Its area was defined in the Victoria Constitution Act of 1855 as containing the County of Anglesey and part of the County of Dalhousie, excepting the area included in the electoral districts of Kyneton Boroughs and Kilmore and the Borough of Seymour.

In between Anglesey's abolition in 1864 and re-creation in 1889, the Electoral district of Kilmore and Anglesey existed from 1877 to 1889, Thomas Hunt was member for its entire existence.

Members for Anglesey

District renamed Electoral district of Dalhousie in 1859.

External links
Electoral district of Anglesey, 1856 Map at State Library Victoria

References

Former electoral districts of Victoria (Australia)
1856 establishments in Australia
1859 disestablishments in Australia
1889 establishments in Australia
1904 disestablishments in Australia